Khiytola is a rural locality (a settlement) in Lakhdenpokhsky District of the Republic of Karelia, Russia.

History
The Finnish name of the settlement (Hiitola) derives from "Hiisi", the name of a forest spirit in the Karelian-Finnish mythology.

Before the Winter War it was a municipality of the Viipuri Province of Finland.

Transportation
Khiytola railway station is a railway junction of the Vyborg–Joensuu and St. Petersburg–Khiytola railways. It has direct suburban connections with Vyborg, Sortavala, and Kuznechnoye. A long-distance train between St. Petersburg and Kostomuksha calls at Khiytola every second day.

Notable people
Eeva Kilpi (b. 1928), feminist writer
Martti Talvela (1935–1989), opera singer (see, for example, Pekka Hako, The Unforgettable Martti Talvela/Unohtumaton Martti Talvela, 2005)

References

External links
History of Khiytola 

Rural localities in the Republic of Karelia
Lakhdenpokhsky District